Eretmocera agassizi is a moth of the family Scythrididae. It was described by Bengt Å. Bengtsson in 2014. It is found in Kenya (Rift Valley).

The wingspan is 11–13 mm. The forewings are olive brown, with a cream streak in the fold extending to a cream spot at the tornus or ending just before that spot. There is a cream spot at the costa beyond the tornal spot. The hindwings are fuscous, sparser scaled at base. The fringes of both wings are fuscous. Adults have been recorded on wing in November and February.

Etymology
The species is named for David Agassiz, who collected the type series.

References

agassizi
Moths described in 2014
Moths of Africa